Mick Jones may refer to:

Music
Mick Jones (Foreigner guitarist) (born 1944), English guitarist, songwriter and record producer in the rock band Foreigner and earlier Spooky Tooth
Mick Jones (album), a 1989 album by Foreigner musician Mick Jones
Mick Jones (The Clash guitarist) (born 1955), British guitarist and a vocalist of The Clash
Micky Jones, British guitarist and a vocalist of Welsh prog band Man
Mickey Jones (1941–2018), American musician and actor

Sports
Mick Jones (footballer, born 1942), English footballer
Mick Jones (footballer, born 1945), of the Leeds United football team
Mick Jones (footballer, born 1947) (1947–2022), English football player and football manager
Mick Jones (hammer thrower) (born 1963), British hammer thrower

See also
Michael Jones (disambiguation)